Cape Fear Regional Jetport , also known as Howie Franklin Field, is a public use airport in Brunswick County, North Carolina, United States. It is owned by the Brunswick County Airport Commission and located one nautical mile (2 km) northeast of the central business district of Oak Island, North Carolina. Formerly known as Brunswick County Airport, it is included in the National Plan of Integrated Airport Systems for 2011–2015, which categorized it as a general aviation facility.

Although many U.S. airports use the same three-letter location identifier for the FAA and IATA, this airport is assigned SUT by the FAA but has no designation from the IATA (which assigned SUT to Sumbawanga Airport in Sumbawanga, Tanzania).

Facilities and aircraft 
Cape Fear Regional Jetport covers an area of 185 acres (75 ha) at an elevation of 26 feet (8 m) above mean sea level. It has one runway designated 5/23 with an asphalt surface measuring 5,505 by 100 feet (1,678 x 30 m).

For the 12-month period ending November 23, 2010, the airport had 77,000 aircraft operations, an average of 210 per day: 96% general aviation and 4% military. At that time there were 67 aircraft based at this airport: 92.5% single-engine, 3% multi-engine, 3% ultralight, and 1.5% helicopter.

References

External links 
 Cape Fear Regional Jetport, official site
 Aerial photo as of March 1999 from USGS The National Map via MSR Maps
 

Airports in North Carolina
Transportation in Brunswick County, North Carolina
Buildings and structures in Brunswick County, North Carolina